Jeremiah Wallace Baldock (March 11, 1842 – December 5, 1919) was an American farmer and politician.

Born in Parma, Ohio, Baldock and his parents moved to Hayton, Wisconsin, in 1852, and then settled in the town of Chilton, Calumet County, Wisconsin. Baldock lived in Brant, Wisconsin and was a farmer. During the American Civil War, Baldock served in the 18th Wisconsin Volunteer Infantry Regiment. In 1899, Baldock served in the Wisconsin State Assembly as a Republican. Baldock died of a stroke at his home in Brant, Wisconsin.

Notes

External links

1842 births
1919 deaths
People from Parma, Ohio
People from Calumet County, Wisconsin
People of Wisconsin in the American Civil War
Farmers from Wisconsin
Republican Party members of the Wisconsin State Assembly
19th-century American politicians
Burials in Wisconsin